Toa Payoh is a planning area and mature residential town located in the northern part of the Central Region of Singapore. Toa Payoh planning area borders Bishan and Serangoon to the north, the Central Water Catchment to the northwest, Kallang to the south, Geylang to the southeast, Novena to the west and Hougang to the east. Toa Payoh New Town is situated in the western portion of the Toa Payoh planning area. The latter occupies a much larger area, encompassing estates such as Potong Pasir and Bidadari.

Etymology
Toa Payoh, in Hokkien, translates as "big swamp" (with toa meaning "big" and payoh meaning "swamp"). The Malay word for swamp is paya. It is the Chinese equivalent of Paya Lebar, which translates to "big swamp land".

Toa Payoh's old Chinese name, was known as Ang Chiang San (alternatively An Xiang Shan) or "burial hill". The area was called as such because of the presence of an old cemetery located in the area.

John Turnbull Thomson, a government surveyor, refers to Toa Payoh in his 1849 agricultural report as Toah Pyoh Lye and Toah Pyoh.

Unique to housing estates in Singapore, roads in Toa Payoh are given Malay-language street prefixes, (e.g. "Jalan Toa Payoh", "Lorong Satu Toa Payoh") as when the town was conceived, Singapore was a state of Malaysia.

History
Toa Payoh was once an extensive and notorious squatter district. Most squatters were engaged in farming and rearing pigs. The others were hawkers, factory workers, mechanics or domestic helpers.

The squatters started moving out in 1962 as a result of increased compensation rates and other practical inducements offered by the Government. Clearance work was able to commence and the redevelopment started in early 1964.

Toa Payoh New Town is Singapore's second oldest satellite town and the first to be built by the Housing and Development Board after the development of Queenstown by the Singapore Improvement Trust in the late 1950s. Before its time as a residential town, Toa Payoh was a squatter district, with a prominent agricultural heritage in the area.

Throughout the 1960s up till the beginning of the 1980s, the town, much like Geylang today, was infamous for its vice, being home to some of Singapore's largest crime syndicates and gangs. Notable cases such as the horrific Toa Payoh ritual murders of 1981, in which people were murdered and stuffed into barrels, brought the town widespread attention. As such, Toa Payoh has also been coined by the media as the "Chicago of the East" and the "Chicago of Singapore".

British Queen Elizabeth II visited the area in the years 1972 (Block 53, Toa Payoh) and 2006 (Block 7, Toa Payoh).

Infrastructure

The layout of the new town follows urban planning principles of the time. The housing estate is self-contained and has a town centre acting as a focal point for the shopping and entertainment needs of the residents.

Industrial developments were also built within the town to provide residents with job opportunities close to home while schools were built within the neighbourhoods.

Toa Payoh Central
The town centre was the first prototype in Singapore. It is surrounded by separated neighbourhoods, each with its own shopping amenities and community centres, well served by a network of vehicular roads and generous open space separating them. The result, as in the English new towns of the 1950s, is that residents tend less to travel to the main town centre but rather to shop within their neighbourhood; if they travel, they would go to the city via the MRT system, at the Toa Payoh and Braddell MRT stations, or public bus services at Toa Payoh Bus Interchange.

Nevertheless, with time, the Toa Payoh Town Centre has become increasingly popular. It has a busy atmosphere because, as with many shopping malls of the time, all commercial activities are concentrated along a single mall with high point blocks on either side and major department stores at each end. The shopping mall is actually L-shaped and there are two plazas, one with a branch library and cinema, the other with an area office and a post office. Each plaza has a department store at either end.

The commercial development, HDB Hub, located at the Toa Payoh Town Centre was completed in 2002. The Housing and Development Board relocated its headquarters from its premises at Bukit Merah to the HDB Hub on 10 June 2002. The HDB Hub comprises two wings, an atrium, four commercial building blocks, a leisure and learning centre and a three-storey basement parking lot. The building also accommodates Singapore's first fully air-conditioned Toa Payoh Bus Interchange and integrates it with the existing Toa Payoh MRT station.

Another landmark of Toa Payoh is the facility of Royal Philips Electronics (the Dutch multinational making medical and electronics equipment). Philips established an extensive facility, parts of which are now owned by Jabil and NXP. The facility has been used by Philips for developing, amongst others, televisions and DVD players for years.

An interesting landmark in Toa Payoh Central is a small tree shrine known as Ci Ern Ge Temple. This shrine goes back to the kampong days before the town was set up. It is currently managed by Toa Payoh Central Merchants’ Association (TPCMA).

Toa Payoh Town Park

The Housing and Development Board decided to allocate a large area of Toa Payoh for a garden-landscaped park, the Toa Payoh Town Garden, despite the pressure on land here for housing.

The town garden used to be popular with visitors who came from near and far to enjoy the display of willows, bamboos and the brilliant reds and yellows of the Delonix regia trees. At the heart of the garden is a 0.8 ha carp pond which contains a waterfall and a cluster of islands linked by bridges. The islands are arranged to provide a sequence of delightful walking experiences not only by day but also by night when the garden is lit. The garden is buffered from the noise and night-time glare of passing traffic along Jalan Toa Payoh by an elevated slope planted with thick rows of Angsanas. There are also a children's playground, seating areas and outdoor chessboard, a tea kiosk and a 27-metre high viewing tower.

Toa Payoh Town Park was partially closed in 1999 to make way for a temporary bus interchange. After the new Toa Payoh Bus Interchange at the HDB Hub was completed in June 2002, the temporary bus interchange was converted to a landscaped park. Toa Payoh Town Garden was subsequently renamed as Toa Payoh Town Park.

Toa Payoh Sensory Park
Designed to engage visitors' senses, the park is divided into five zones based on the five senses.

Sports and recreation
The sporting facilities are based in the southern central part of Toa Payoh, which is located near the town centre. It consists of 3500 seater Toa Payoh Stadium, where S.League club Balestier Khalsa FC plays its home games. Toa Payoh Sports Hall is located besides the stadium, as well as the Singapore Table Tennis Association Academy. Meanwhile, there is also Toa Payoh Swimming Complex, where national swimmers train at the complex.

Besides these facilities located in the centre of the town, there are also street football courts, gym facilities and basketball courts available at various neighbourhoods of Toa Payoh. Meanwhile, SAFRA clubhouse is located besides Toa Payoh Stadium.

Politics
Toa Payoh is entirely located within the Bishan-Toa Payoh Group Representation Constituency, while a portion of Lorong 8 Toa Payoh was in the Potong Pasir Single Member Constituency prior to 2020. The section which is part of Bishan-Toa Payoh GRC is divided into three divisions, mainly Toa Payoh Central, Toa Payoh East and Toa Payoh West-Thomson. The members of parliament are Defence Minister Ng Eng Hen, Saktiandi Supaat and Chee Hong Tat of the People's Action Party, the ruling party of Singapore.

Education
CHIJ Primary (Toa Payoh)
CHIJ Secondary (Toa Payoh)
Pei Chun Public School
Kheng Cheng School
Beatty Secondary School
First Toa Payoh Primary School

Toa Payoh New Town 
Cedar Primary School
Saint Andrew's Junior School
Marymount Convent School
Maris Stella High School (Primary)
Maris Stella High School (Secondary)
Bartley Secondary School
Cedar Girls' Secondary school
Saint Andrew's Secondary School

Popular Culture
TV shows
Home in Toa Payoh on MediaCorp Channel 8

Books
Toa Payoh: Our Kind Of Neighbourhood by Koh, Buck Song, a coffeetable corporate history of the Housing and Development Board and of 40 years of public housing, told through the stories of five families in Toa Payoh. Times Editions, Singapore, 2000. .

Poems
"A Brief History of Toa Payoh" by Koh, Buck Song, published in the verse anthology "A Brief History of Toa Payoh And Other Poems", Imperial Publishing House, Singapore, 1992, and on the website of Bishan-Toa Payoh Town Council at http://www.btptc.org.sg/About%20Us/Poem.html
"Toa Payoh Reborn" by Koh, Buck Song, in the Cultural Medallion project coffee table book Heartlands: Home And Nation In The Art Of Ong Kim Seng, Singapore 2008.

References

Victor R Savage, Brenda S A Yeoh (2003), Toponymics – A Study of Singapore Street Names, Eastern Universities Press, 
Norman Edwards, Peter Keys (1996), Singapore – A Guide to Buildings, Streets, Places, Times Books International,

External links

Toa Payoh Free Online Community Forums (Toa Payoh.NET)

 
Central Region, Singapore
Hokkien place names
New towns in Singapore
Places in Singapore
New towns started in the 1960s